

Events

May events 
 May 17 – The Monkland and Kirkintilloch Railway in Scotland is authorised; construction begins the following month.

October events 
 October 29 - Liverpool and Manchester Railway Company, in England, issues its first prospectus.

December events 
 December 31 - George Stephenson, his son Robert Stephenson, Edward Pease and Michael Longridge form George Stephenson and Company, a railway construction consultancy.

Births

March births
 March 9 - Leland Stanford, a member of The Big Four group of financiers in California.

October births 
 October 2 - Henry C. Lord, president of the Atchison, Topeka and Santa Fe Railway 1868–1869 (d. 1884).

November births 
 November 14 – James Mitchell Ashley, founder and president of Ann Arbor Railroad, is born (d. 1896).

Unknown date births
 John Cooke, founder of American steam locomotive manufacturing company Cooke Locomotive Works (d. 1882).

Deaths

References